Dara Calleary (born 10 May 1973) is an Irish Fianna Fáil politician who has served as Minister of State for Trade Promotion, Digital and Company Regulation since August 2022. He has been a Teachta Dála (TD) for the Mayo constituency since the 2007 general election. He served as Minister for Agriculture, Food and the Marine from July to August 2020, Deputy Leader of Fianna Fáil from 2018 to 2020 and Minister of State for Labour Affairs from 2009 to 2011.

Early life
Calleary was born in Ballina, County Mayo, in 1973. He was educated at St Oliver Plunkett National School and St Muredach's College. He later studied at Trinity College Dublin. He previously worked with Chambers Ireland, the largest business organisation in Ireland, and also worked in an Irish bank.

Calleary is the son of Seán Calleary who was a TD for Mayo East from 1973 to 1992, and the grandson of Phelim Calleary who was a TD for Mayo North from 1952 to 1969.

Political career
Calleary has been a member of the Fianna Fáil National Executive since 1997 and has served on party policy committees on Transport, Enterprise and Employment, Agriculture and Youth Affairs.

He was first elected to the Dáil at the 2007 general election. In 2007, Calleary chaired the first ever Ógra Fianna Fáil branch meeting in Northern Ireland, at Queen's University Belfast. In February 2008, Calleary was appointed Chairman of Ógra Fianna Fáil, by Taoiseach Bertie Ahern, at the National Youth Conference in Tullamore, County Offaly.

Minister of State
On 22 April 2009, he was appointed Minister of State at the Department of Enterprise, Trade and Employment, with special responsibility for labour affairs. On 23 March 2010, he was given additional responsibilities, as Minister of State at the Department of the Taoiseach, at the Department of Finance and at the Department of Enterprise, Trade and Innovation (following departmental restructuring), with special responsibilities for public service transformation and labour affairs.

Opposition spokesperson
In the Fianna Fáil Front Bench, he served as Opposition Spokesperson for Jobs, Enterprise and Innovation from 2011 to 2016 and Opposition Spokesperson for Public Expenditure and Reform from 2016 to 2018.

In March 2018, he was appointed Deputy leader of Fianna Fáil by party leader Micheál Martin.

Following the 2020 general election, Calleary served as Fianna Fáil's chief negotiator as the party worked on a deal with Fine Gael and the Green Party to enter into government as a coalition.

Appintment as Government Chief Whip
On 27 June 2020, at the formation of the new government, Calleary was appointed by Taoiseach Micheál Martin as Minister of State at the Department of the Taoiseach with responsibility as Chief Whip. Although Calleary was deputy leader of Fianna Fáil and chief negotiator for Fianna Fáil, he was not appointed to cabinet. The lack of any representative in the cabinet from the west of Ireland was heavily criticised by some. An article by the Mayo-based Western People declared it "a cabinet fit for Cromwell". While Calleary accepted the role, he publicly acknowledged that he was "angry and disappointed" not to have been offered a departmental portfolio and said that he still saw himself eventually leading a department. On 1 July, he was appointed to the further position of Minister of State for the Gaeltacht and Sport.

Appointment to cabinet and resignation
On 15 July 2020, following the sacking of Barry Cowen from the position, Calleary was appointed as Minister for Agriculture, Food and the Marine by Micheál Martin.

On 20 August 2020, Calleary was implicated in the Oireachtas Golf Society scandal when news broke that Calleary and 81 others attended an Oireachtas Golf Society dinner the previous day, in apparent breach of Government COVID-19 guidelines. He resigned as Agriculture Minister the following morning. Calleary stated to MidWest Radio that "I made a big mistake. I shouldn't have gone to the function. I didn't want to let people down and I take responsibility for that mistake". Michael Clifford and Paul Hosford of the Irish Examiner, suggested that the scandal had "left [Calleary's] political career in tatters" and had deeply rocked the Martin Cabinet. Three days later on 24 August 2020, he also resigned as Deputy Leader of Fianna Fáil. In February 2022, a District Court concluded that the event had not breached public health guidelines and had been safely organised.

Return as Minister of State
On 31 August 2022, following the resignation of Robert Troy, Calleary was appointed as Minister of State at the Department of Enterprise, Trade and Employment with special responsibility for Trade Promotion, Digital and Company Regulation.

See also
Families in the Oireachtas

References

External links

Dara Calleary's page on the Fianna Fáil website

 

1973 births
Living people
Alumni of Trinity College Dublin
Dara
Fianna Fáil TDs
Members of the 30th Dáil
Members of the 31st Dáil
Members of the 32nd Dáil
Members of the 33rd Dáil
Ministers of State of the 30th Dáil
People from Ballina, County Mayo
Politicians from County Mayo
Ministers of State of the 33rd Dáil
Government Chief Whip (Ireland)
Ministers for Agriculture (Ireland)